Heidi Andersson (born 27 February 1981 in the locality of Ensamheten, Storuman, Sweden) is a Swedish armwrestler. She has won the World Championships in armwrestling eleven times. She is married to Swedish biathlete Björn Ferry, with whom she has a son, Dante Andersson Ferry, born 19 July 2011.

Championships won

 World Championship 1999, Tokyo, Japan, 60 kg
 World Championship 2000, Rovaniemi, Finland, 60 kg
 World Championship 2002, Springfield, Illinois, United States, 60 kg
 World Championship 2003, Ottawa, Canada, 65 kg
 World Championship 2004, Durban, South Africa, 65 kg
 World Championship 2008, Kelowna, Canada, 60 kg
 World Championship 2009, Rosolina Di Mare, Italy, 65 kg
 World Championship 2010, Mesquite, Nevada, United States, 70 kg
 World Championship 2011, Almaty, Kazakhstan, 70 kg
 World Championship 2014, Vilnius, Lithuania, 65 kg left arm
 World Championship 2014, Vilnius, Lithuania, 65 kg right arm
 European Championship 1999, Rochefort, Belgium, 55 kg
 European Championship 2008, Sarpsborg, Norway, 60 kg
 European Championship 2014, Baku, Azerbaijan, 65 kg

References

External links

Official homepage

1981 births
Living people
Swedish arm wrestlers
Swedish sportswomen
People from Ensamheten
Sportspeople from Västerbotten County
21st-century Swedish women
Female arm wrestlers